Jesús Cisneros (born 18 March 1979) is a Peruvian football manager and former player who played as a goalkeeper. He is the current goalkeeper coach of Cienciano.

Club career
Jesús Cisneros started his career in the 2000 Torneo Descentralizado season with Unión Minas.

He then played for Estudiantes de Medicina in the 2002 season.

The following season, he joined Alianza Lima, but was only there for one season.

Then in January 2004 Cisneros joined Cienciano.

Honours

Club
Alianza Lima
Torneo Descentralizado: 2003

Cienciano
Recopa Sudamericana: 2004
 Apertura: 2005
 Clausura: 2006

References

External links

1979 births
Living people
Association football goalkeepers
Peruvian footballers
Peruvian Primera División players
Peruvian Segunda División players
Unión Minas footballers
Estudiantes de Medicina footballers
Club Alianza Lima footballers
Cienciano footballers
Sport Huancayo footballers
Colegio Nacional Iquitos footballers
León de Huánuco footballers
Club Deportivo Universidad César Vallejo footballers
Juan Aurich footballers
Peruvian football managers
Cienciano managers